Antonio Rojas may refer to:

 Antonio de Rojas Manrique (died 1527), Roman Catholic prelate
 Antonio Rojas (guerrilla) (1818–1865), Mexican guerrilla
 Antonio Rojas (Paraguayan footballer) (born 1984), midfielder
 Antonio Rojas (Spanish footballer) (born 1984), centre forward
 José Antonio Rojas (born 1987), Chilean footballer

See also
 Rojas
 Rojas (disambiguation)